This is a comprehensive list of songs by the Pixies, an American alternative rock band. This list includes album tracks, B-sides, demos, live recordings and remixes of songs written by one or more of the band's members or songs covered by the band; it does not include songs that members of the Pixies wrote, recorded or performed with Frank Black and the Catholics, The Breeders, The Martinis, or any solo projects.

All songs written by Black Francis, except as noted.

Pixies